Nedelko or Nedilko (Russian: Неделько, Ukrainian: Неділько) is a gender-neutral Slavic surname that may refer to
Danny Nedelko, Ukrainian immigrant to the United Kingdom, subject of the song by the British punk rock band Idles
Ivan Nedelko (born 1986), Russian tennis player
Vitaliy Nedilko (born 1982), Ukrainian football goalkeeper

See also
 

Russian-language surnames
Ukrainian-language surnames